Cabrera is a town and municipality in Sumapaz Province in Cundinamarca Department, Colombia. 
This town was founded in the 1920s. It is located 4 hours from Bogota and its area is known by the production of livestock, fruit and more recently the best variety of beans in the world in the mid-1990s.

External links 
Official site 

Municipalities of Cundinamarca Department